A Tragedy of the Orient is a 1914 American silent short drama film directed by Reginald Barker and featuring Sessue Hayakawa, Tsuru Aoki, Frank Borgaze and George Osborne in important roles.

References

External links 
 

1914 films
Silent American drama films
American black-and-white films
1914 drama films
1914 short films
Films directed by Reginald Barker
American silent short films
1910s American films